Sacrifice is Sylver's fifth studio album, released on 12 May 2009 in Belgium. The workingtitle was 'Resurrection', in the end Sylver decided to name the album 'Sacrifice'.
Guitarist John Miles Jr. (son of John Miles) is also on the album cover, who joined the band a short while before.

Track listing

Singles 

 "One World One Dream" was released as the first single from the album. It was also used as the theme for the Olympics 2008. It charted at #21 in Belgium.
 "Rise Again" was chosen as the second single from the album at the end of 2008. The single also charted at #21 in Belgium
 "I Hate You Now" was released as the third single in March 2009 before the album was released. It became a success for Sylver and it charted at #8 in Belgium
 "Foreign Affair" has been released on 12 June 2009, as the fourth single from the album. It proved to be the most successful single from the album, which is unusual for a fourth single, and it charted at #3 in Belgium. Their highest chart position there since "Skin" in 2001 charted at #2.
 "Music" was released as the fifth single from the album in November 2009. It is a duet with John Miles. It has so far charted at #11 at the Belgian ultratop50.

Charts

References 

2009 albums
Sylver albums